Patrick Aisa (born 6 July 1994) is a Papua New Guinean footballer who plays as a striker for Hekari United F.C. in the Papua New Guinea National Soccer League.

International career

International goals
Scores and results list Papua New Guinea's goal tally first.

References

1994 births
Living people
Papua New Guinean footballers
Association football forwards
Eastern Stars FC players
Papua New Guinea international footballers
2016 OFC Nations Cup players